Sabellaria is a genus of marine polychaete worms in the family Sabellariidae. The type species is Sabellaria alveolata (Linnaeus, 1767). These worms are sedentary and build tubes in which to live from sand and shell fragments. Some species are called honeycomb worms and when they occur in great numbers they can form reefs on rocks and other hard substrates. They are filter feeders, extending a plume-like fan of radioles from the end of the tube in order to catch plankton and detritus floating past. They have a distinctive operculum which is used to block the opening of the tube when the radioles are retracted.

Species
The following species are listed by the World Register of Marine Species:

Sabellaria alcocki Gravier, 1906
Sabellaria alveolata (Linnaeus, 1767)
Sabellaria bella (Grube, 1870)
Sabellaria bellani Kirtley, 1994
Sabellaria bellis Hansen, 1882
Sabellaria chandraae Silva, 1961
Sabellaria clava Kirtley, 1994
Sabellaria eupomatoides Augener, 1918
Sabellaria fissidens (Grube, 1870)
Sabellaria floridensis Hartman, 1944
Sabellaria fosterae Kirtley, 1994
Sabellaria fucicola Augener, 1918
Sabellaria gilchristi McIntosh, 1924
Sabellaria gracilis Hartman, 1944
Sabellaria grueti Kirtley, 1994
Sabellaria guinensis Augener, 1918
Sabellaria intoshi Fauvel, 1914
Sabellaria ishikawai Okuda, 1938
Sabellaria isumiensis Nishi et al. 2010
Sabellaria javanica Augener, 1934
Sabellaria longispina Grube, 1848
Sabellaria lotensis Kirtley, 1994
Sabellaria magnifica Grube, 1848
Sabellaria marskaae Kirtley, 1994
Sabellaria minuta Carrasco & Bustos, 1981
Sabellaria miryaensis Parab & Gaikwad, 1990
Sabellaria moorei Monro, 1933
Sabellaria nanella Chamberlin, 1919
Sabellaria orensanzi Kirtley, 1994
Sabellaria pectinata Fauvel, 1932
Sabellaria ranjhi Hasan, 1960
Sabellaria spinularia
Sabellaria spinulosa Leuckart, 1849
Sabellaria taurica (Rathke, 1837)
Sabellaria tottoriensis Nishi, Kato & Hayahi, 2004
Sabellaria vulgaris Verrill, 1873
Sabellaria wilsoni Lana & Gruet, 1989

References

Sabellida
Polychaete genera